Drillia meridiana is a species of sea snail, a marine gastropod mollusc in the family Drilliidae.

Distribution
This marine species occurs off South Madagascar.

References

 Perugia I. & Prelle G. (2012) A new species from South Madagascar. Malacologia Mostra Mondiale 76: 17

External links
 

meridiana
Gastropods described in 2012